The Tuleyries is an ante-bellum estate near White Post, Virginia.

History 
The complex was built around 1833 by Colonel Joseph Tuley, Jr. (1796–1860), a large slaveholder, who made the name a pun on his name and the Tuileries Palace.  The house is a late Federal style mansion with a domed entrance hall. The house was sold by the Tuley family to Colonel Upton Lawrence Boyce (1830–1907) in 1866.

In 1903 the property was acquired by Graham Furber Blandy (1868–1926), who hired Philadelphia architect Mantle Fielding (1865–1941) to restore and improve the mansion. Two-thirds The Tuleyries – as part of The Estate of Graham Furber Blandy, Deceased – was bequeathed to the University of Virginia.

That land is now known as the Blandy Experimental Farm and The Virginia State Arboretum. The remaining property and house remained in the Blandy family. As well as twenty acres of lawn and garden the property includes a further three hundred and eighty six  acres of forest and farm.

It was listed on the National Register of Historic Places in 1972.

Bibliography

Notes

References 

  ; . ; .

  ; .
The author was the wife of Orme Wilson, Jr., U.S. Ambassador to Haiti under Franklin D. Roosevelt. She was also a sister-in-law of Graham Furber Blandy

 

 

 .

External links
 
 Tuleyries, State Route 628 vicinity, White Post, Clarke County, VA at the Historic American Buildings Survey (HABS)

Houses in Clarke County, Virginia
Houses completed in 1833
Federal architecture in Virginia
Plantation houses in Virginia
Houses on the National Register of Historic Places in Virginia
National Register of Historic Places in Clarke County, Virginia
Historic American Buildings Survey in Virginia